Calophyllum caudatum is a species of flowering plant in the Calophyllaceae family. It is found only in West Papua in Indonesia.

References

caudatum
Flora of Western New Guinea
Vulnerable plants
Taxonomy articles created by Polbot